The Menengai I Geothermal Power Station is a  geothermal power plant under construction  in Kenya.

Location
The coordinates of Menengai Crater are: 0°11'35.0"S, 36°04'12.0"E (Latitude:-0.193048; Longitude:36.070000).

Overview
The power stations are:
1. Menengai I Geothermal Power Station: Owned by Orpower Twenty Two. 2. Menengai II Geothermal Power Station: Owned by Quantum Power East Africa and 3. Menengai III Geothermal Power Station: Owned by Sosian Energy.

Menengai I Geothermal Power Station uses new geothermal technology jointly developed by Toshiba Corporation and Ormat Technologies Inc to harness more energy from the steam supplied to the plant by increasing efficiency.

Ownership
The power station is owned by a consortium (Orpower Twenty Two), whose shareholding is illustrated in the table below: Swiss Vital Capital became a shareholder in 2018, after Israel's Ormat Technologies indicated its intention to divest from the project in 2018.

See also

List of power stations in Kenya
Geothermal power in Kenya

References

External links
GDC reports current steam output of 130 MW at Menengai

Geothermal power stations in Kenya
Power stations in Kenya